The following is a list of women classical pianists by nationality – notable women who are well known for their work in the field of classical music.

Albania
Edlira Dedja (fl. 1990s), pianist, art critic and opera promotor

Argentina
Mariana Alandia (born 1941), concert pianist
Martha Argerich (born 1941), concert pianist, recording artist and virtuoso icon
Ingrid Fliter (born 1973), classical pianist and recording artist
Violeta Hemsy de Gainza (born 1929), pianist and educator
Sylvia Kersenbaum (born 1945), pianist, composer and educator

Armenia
Nareh Arghamanyan (born 1989), award-winning classical pianist
Svetlana Navasardyan (born 1946), classical concert pianist
Varduhi Yeritsyan (born 1981), concert pianist now based in France

Australia
Rebecca Chambers (born 1975) concert pianist, teacher, Director of Kidko Performing Arts
Vera Bradford (1904–2004), pianist and teacher
Tamara Anna Cislowska, pianist
Lucinda Collins (fl. 1980s), pianist, educator, chamber musician
Anna Goldsworthy (born 1974), writer, pianist and teacher
Sonya Hanke (1933–1993), pianist and educator
Miriam Hyde (1913–2005), composer, pianist, educator and poet
Maureen Jones (born 1927), pianist
Eileen Joyce (1908–1991), distinguished concert pianist
Elena Kats-Chernin (born 1957), pianist and composer
Anne Macky (1887–1964), composer and pianist
Stephanie McCallum (born 1956), pianist and teacher
Hephzibah Menuhin (1920–1981), American-Australian pianist, writer and human rights activist
Lisa Moore (born 1960), pianist
Ariel Shearer (born c.1905), composer and classical pianist
Kathryn Selby (born 1962), pianist
Constance Brandon Usher (fl. 1900s), classical pianist
Natasha Vlassenko (born 1956), Russian-Australian concert pianist and educator
Nancy Weir (1915–2008), pianist and educator
Sally Whitwell (born 1974), pianist and composer

Austria
Luna Alcalay (1928–2012), Croatian-born Austrian pianist, music educator and composer
Ilse von Alpenheim (born 1927), international classical pianist and chamber musician focusing on early romantic composers
Marianna Auenbrugger (1759–1782), pianist and composer who studied under Haydn and Salieri
Josepha Barbara Auernhammer (1758–1820), pianist who studied under Mozart
Donka Angatscheva (born 1979), Austrian pianist of Bulgarian descent
Ingrid Haebler (born 1929), international concert pianist and recording artist
Cornelia Herrmann (born 1977), pianist and chamber musician
Anastasia Huppmann (born 1988), Russian-born Austrian concert pianist
Mathilde Kralik (1857–1944), pianist and composer
Christiana Lin (fl. 1980s), Taiwanese-born Austrian pianist and harpsichordist
Henriette von Pereira-Arnstein (1780–1859), Austrian pianist and salon-holder
Barbara Ployer (born 1765), piano and composition pupil of Mozart
Lisa Smirnova (born 1972), Russian-born Austrian pianist

Azerbaijan
Yegana Akhundova (born 1960), pianist, composer and educator
Khadija Gayibova (1893–1938), pianist and educator who played the Azeri mugham

Belarus
Marina Osman (born 1965), classical and jazz concert pianist
Hanna Shybayeva (born 1979), concert pianist and chamber musician

Belgium
Eugénie-Emilie Juliette Folville (1870–1946), pianist, violinist, educators, conductor and composer
Jacqueline Fontyn (born 1930), contemporary composer, pianist and music educator
Irina Lankova (born 1977), Russian-Belgian concert pianist and recording artist
Flore Levine-Cousyns (1898–1989), concert pianist and educator
Marcelle Mercenier (1920–1996), pianist and educator
Jeanne-Catherine Pauwels (1795–1889), pianist who performed in Brussels salons
Janine Reding (1920–2015), pianist who performed internationally in piano duos
Éliane Reyes (born 1977), pianist, chamber musician and educator
Edna Stern (born 1977), Belgian-Israeli pianist and educator now based in London

Bolivia
Mariana Alandia (fl. 2000s), classical pianist keen on Bolivian composers

Bosnia and Herzegovina
Milica Pap (born 1973), classical pianist and educator
Dženana Šehanović (born 1991), educator and professional pianist

Brazil
Yara Bernette (1920–2002), internationally acclaimed classical pianist
Helza Cameu (1903–1995), composer, pianist, musicologist and writer
Dinorá de Carvalho (c.1905–1980), pianist, conductor, music educator and composer
Chiquinha Gonzaga (1847–1935), composer, pianist and conductor
Débora Halász (fl. 1990s), classical pianist, harpsichordist and educator
Clelia Iruzun (fl. 1988), concert pianist based in London
Guiomar Novaes (1895–1979), globally recognized Brazilian concert pianist
Cristina Ortiz (born 1950), international concert pianist
Sonia Rubinsky (born 1957), international concert pianist
Antonietta Rudge (1885–1974), internationally recognized pianist and educator
Anna Stella Schic (1922–2009), pianist, music writer and educator
Clara Sverner (born 1936), classical concert pianist specializing in Brazilian music
Magda Tagliaferro (1893–1986), international concert pianist and educator

Bulgaria
Dora Deliyska (born 1980), concert pianist based in Vienna
Iren Dimitrova (born 1950), pianist, chamber musician and educator
Plamena Mangova (born 1980), concert pianist
Svetla Protich (born 1939), concert pianist and educator
Emma Tahmizian (born 1957), pianist of Armenian descent
Angela Tosheva (born 1961), pianist, chamber musician, educator, editor and publisher
Julia Tsenova (1948–2010), award-winning composer, pianist and educator

Canada
Frances Adaskin (1900–2001), pianist who worked as an accompanist
Ellen Ballon (1896–1969), child prodigy, pianist and educator
Louise Bessette (born 1959), pianist specializing in contemporary music
Jocelyne Binet (1923–1968), composer, pianist and music educator
Patricia Blomfield Holt (1910–2003), composer, pianist and music educators
Marika Bournaki (b. 1991) pianist, founding member Mile-End Piano Trio, core member Frisson ensemble, educator
Albertine Caron-Legris (1906–1972), pianist, composer and music educator
Victoria Cartier (1867–1955), pianist, organist and music educator
Eva Clare (1885–1961), pianist, music writer and educator
Françoise de Clossey (born 1974), concert pianist and organist
Jane Coop (born 1950), pianist and music pedagogue
Marylou Dawes (1933–2013), concert pianist, accompanist, chamber musician and educator
Isabelle Delorme (1900–1991), pianist, composer and music educator
Lucille Dompierre (1899–1968), child prodigy, concert pianist and arranger
Sophie Carmen Eckhardt-Gramatté (1899–1974), Russian-born Canadian composer, virtuoso pianist and violinist
Anne Eggleston (1934–1994), pianist, composer and educator
Gladys Ewart (1892–1957), concert pianist, accompanist and music educator
Janina Fialkowska (born 1951), classical concert pianist and recording artist
Janina Fialkowska (1899–1988), pianist, composer, publisher, music editor and educator
Marian Grudeff (1927–2006), concert pianist, music educator and musical theatre composer
Johana Harris (1912–1995), pianist, composer and music educator
Angela Hewitt (born 1958), classical pianist specialising in Bach
Alice Ho (born 1960), pianist and notable Canadian composer
Anna Moncrieff Hovey (1902–1995), pianist, accompanist and music educator
Yvonne Hubert (1895–1988), Belgian-born Canadian pianist and eminent educator
Elaine Keillor (born 1939), musicologist, pianist and music writer specializing in Canadian composers
Gwendolyn Koldofsky (1906–1998), piano accompanist and music educator
Lubka Kolessa (1902–1997), Ukrainian-born Canadian classical pianist and educator
Patricia Krueger (born 1946), classical pianist, organist and percussionist
Gordana Lazarevich (born 1939), pianist, musicologist and educator
Germaine Malépart (1898–1963), pianist and music educator
Diana McIntosh (born 1937), composer and pianist
Albertine Morin-Labrecque (1886–1957), pianist, soprano, composer and music educator
Renée Morisset (1928–2009), pianist who played piano duos with her husband
Dorothy Morton (1924–2008), pianist and music educator
Marie-Thérèse Paquin (1905–1997), concert pianist and educator
Christina Petrowska-Quilico (born 1948), classical concert pianist and recording artist
Karen Quinton (fl. 1970s), pianist, organist, harpsichordist and music educator
Dana Reason (fl. 1994), pianist, composer, recording artist and broadcaster
Jacqueline Richard (1928–2015), pianist and conductor
Anastasia Rizikov (born 1998), award-winning concert pianist
Viviana Sofronitsky (fl. 1982), Russian-born Canadian pianist now based in the Czech Republic
Alexandra Stréliski (born 1985), neo-classical composer and pianist
Lorraine Vaillancourt (born 1947), pianist, conductor and educator
Catherine Vickers (born 1952), pianist and educator now based in Germany
Ruth Watson Henderson (born 1932), composer, pianist and accompanist

Chile
Delfina de la Cruz (1837–1905), pianist and First Lady of Chile
Nina Frick Asenjo (1884–1963), pianist and composer
Edith Fischer (born 1935), classical pianist; daughter of Elena Waiss
Rosita Renard (1894–1949), classical pianist
Carla Sandoval (born 1982), pianist and chamber musician
Mahani Teave (born 1983), classical pianist and educator from Easter Island
Elena Waiss (1908–1988), pianist, music school founder

China
Jie Chen (born 1985), international concert pianist
Sa Chen (born 1979), award-winning classical pianist
Cheng Wai (fl. 2000s), Hong Kong award-winning pianist
Guo Shan (born 1946), contemporary classical pianist
Sunny Li (born 1991), concert pianist based in London
Yuja Wang (born 1987), internationally recognized concert pianist
Di Wu (fl. 1990s), Chinese-American classical pianist
Wu Qian (born 1984), award-winning classical pianist
Wu Yili (1931–2019), Chinese-Singaporean classical pianist
Di Xiao (fl. 1996), international concert pianist now based in the UK
Xie Jingxian (born 1983), award-winning Chinese concert pianist
Zhang Dingyuan (born 1976), pianist and educator
Mélodie Zhao (born 1994), pianist, composer and conductor
Yin Zheng (fl. 2000s), concert pianist and educator
Zhang Zuo (born 1988), award-winning classical pianist
Zhu Xiao-Mei (born 1949), classical pianist and educator now based in Paris

Colombia
Josefina Acosta de Barón (born 1897), composer, pianist and educator
Teresita Gómez (born 1943), influential pianist and educator

Croatia
Martina Filjak (born 1978), international concert pianist
Eva Kirchmayer-Bilić (born 1971), pianist, chamber musician organist and educator
Melita Lorković (1907–1987), international concert pianist and educator
Ana-Marija Markovina (born 1970), classical pianist based in Cologne
Branka Musulin (1917–1975), German-Croatian classical pianist and educator
Ivana Švarc-Grenda (born 1970), classical pianist specializing in Chopin

Cuba
María de las Mercedes Adam de Aróstegui (1873–1957), Cuban pianist and composed based in Spain
Cecilia Arizti (1856–1930), composer, pianist and educator
Catalina Berroa (1849–1911), pianist, music teacher, composer
Nohema Fernández (born 1944), pianist and educator who emigrated to the United States.
Emma Martínez de la Torre Shelton (1889–1980), pianist and composer active in the Canary Islands
Arminda Schutte (1909–1995), classical pianist and educator who settled in the United States

Cyprus
Rüya Taner (born 1971), Turkish Cypriot pianist now in Ankara

Czech Republic
Alice Herz-Sommer (1903–2014), Jewish pianist, music teacher and holocaust survivor
Eliška Kleinová (1912–1999), Jewish pianist and music educator
Ilona Štěpánová-Kurzová (1899–1975), concert pianist and educator
Kristýna Znamenáčková (born 1988), classical pianist

Denmark
Agnes Adler (1865–1935), pianist and chamber musician
Dagmar Borup (1867–1959), pianist and educator
Katrine Gislinge (born 1969), pianist and chamber musician
Margaret Hamerik (1867–1942), American-born Danish composer and pianist
Elisabeth Klein (1911–2004), Hungarian-born Danish pianist who specialized in contemporary music
Amalie Malling (born 1948), German-born Danish classical pianist and educator
Anne Øland (1949–2015), concert pianist and educator
Marianna Shirinyan (born 1978), Armenian-Danish pianist and chamber musician
Johanne Stockmarr (1869–1944), virtuoso concert pianist
Esther Vagning (1905–1986), concert pianist, accompanist, chamber musician and educator
Catharine Wernicke (1789–1862), early female concert pianist
Galina Werschenska (1906–1994), Russian-born Danish pianist, chamber musician and educator
Elisabeth Westenholz (born 1942), pianist, organist and recording artist
Assia Zlatkowa (born 1953), popular Bulgarian-Danish pianist who performed from age 8

Dominican Republic
Ninón Lapeiretta de Brouwer (1907–1989), composer and pianist

Egypt
Mona Ghoneim (born 1955), composer and pianist

Estonia
Irina Zahharenkova (born 1976), pianist and harpsichordist

Finland
Tuija Hakkila (born 1959), pianist and educator
France Ellegaard (1913–1999), Danish-born Finnish pianist and educator considered one of the 20th century's great concert pianists

France
Irène Aïtoff (1904–2006), pianist, accompanist and voice educator
Miirrha Alhambra (1890–1957), stage name of the pianist Pauline Joutard
Annie d'Arco (1920–1998), classical pianist
Yvonne Arnaud (1890–1958), pianist, singer and actress
Racha Arodaky (fl. 2000s), Syrian-French concert pianist
Delphine Bardin (born 1974), contemporary classical pianist
Nathalie Béra-Tagrine (born 1960), classical pianist of Russian descent
Marie Bigot (1786–1820), pianist, educator, composer
Myriam Birger (born 1951), pianist who has performed from an early age
Jeanne Blancard (1884–1972), composer and pianist
Michèle Boegner (1941–2021), concert pianist
Véronique Bonnecaze (fl. 2000s), classical pianist and educator
Marie-Léontine Bordes-Pène (1858–1924), pianist specializing in French composers
Hélène Boschi (1917–1990), French-Swiss pianist and educator
Magdeleine Boucherit Le Faure (1879–1960), pianist, composer and educator
Brigitte Bouthinon-Dumas (born 1947), pianist, music educator and writer
Emma Boynet (1891–1974), classical pianist
Marie-Françoise Bucquet (1937–2018), pianist and educator
Agnelle Bundervoët (1922–2015), pianist and composer, one of more notable French pianists of the 20th century
Khatia Buniatishvili (born 1987), Georgian-born French concert pianist
Paule Carrère-Dencausse (1891–1967), concert pianist and educator
Gaby Casadesus (1901–1999), pianist and educator
Cécile Chaminade (1857–1944), composer and pianist
Claire Chevallier (born 1969), Franco-Belgian pianist specializing in the fortepiano
Françoise Choveaux (born 1953), composer and pianist
Wilhelmine Clauss-Szarvady (1832–1907), Bohemian-born French pianist
France Clidat (1932–2012), classical pianist specializing in Liszt
Catherine Collard (1947–1993), concert pianist and chamber musician
Jeanne-Marie Darré (1905–1999), classical pianist specializing in Chopin and Liszt
Célimène Daudet (born 1977), contemporary classical pianist and educator
Florence Delaage (fl. 2000s), contemporary classical pianist
Jeanne Demessieux (1921–1968), organist, pianist, composer and educator
Lucette Descaves (1906–1993), pianist and educator
Claire Désert (born 1967), pianist and educator
Françoise Deslogères (born 1929), pianist and ondist
Marie Dihau (1843–1935), singer, pianist and educator
Geneviève Dinand (1927–1987), classical pianist
Françoise Doreau (1910–2011), pianist and chamber musician
Thérèse Dussaut (born 1939), pianist and music educator
Stéphanie Elbaz (fl. 2010s), concert pianist
Brigitte Engerer (1952–2012), pianist, educator and recording artist
Jacqueline Eymar (1922–2008), pianist with an interest in contemporary composers
Laure Favre-Kahn (born 1976), classical pianist
Victoire Ferrari (1785–c.1823), pianist and voice educator
Elena Filonova (fl. 2000s), contemporary pianist of Russian origin
Marylin Frascone (born 1975), contemporary classical pianist
Reine Gianoli (1915–1979), pianist and educator
Marie-Catherine Girod (born 1949), pianist and educator
Lélia Gousseau (1909–1997), classical pianist
Yvonne Gouverné (1890–1982), pianist, accompanist and choir conductor
Hélène Grimaud (born 1969), classical pianist and wildlife conservationist
Youra Guller (1895–1980), classical pianist of Russian-Romanian heritage
Annette Haas (1912–2002), concert pianist and educator
Monique Haas (1909–1987), pianist specializing in French composers
Guy d'Hardelot (1858–1936), pen name of the composer, pianist and educator Helen Rhodes
Nicole Henriot-Schweitzer (1925–2001), pianist and educator
Jeanne Herscher-Clément (1878–1941), pianist and composer
Cécile Hugonnard-Roche (fl. 1970s), pianist and educator
Marie Jaëll (1846–1925) pianist, composer and educator
Catherine Joly (fl. 1970s), classical pianist
Suzanne Joly (1914–2012), child prodigy, composer and pianist
Geneviève Joy (1919–2009), classical and modernist pianist
Marie-Josèphe Jude (born 1968), classical pianist
Clotilde Kleeberg (1866–1909), classical pianist who performed throughout Europe
Monique de La Bruchollerie (1915–1972), concert pianist
Frédérique Lagarde (fl. 1980s), pianist performing in a saxophone-piano duo
Françoise Landowski-Caillet (1917–2007), pianist and painter
Claire-Marie Le Guay (born 1974), concert pianist and recording artist
Yvonne Lefébure (1898–1986), pianist and educator
Marguerite Long (1874–1966), pianist and educator
Yvonne Loriod (1924–2010), pianist, educator and composer
Anne Lovett (fl. 2000s), pianist and recording artist based in London
Gisèle Magnan (fl. 1980s), classical pianist
Lily Maisky (born 1987), classical pianist
Xénia Maliarevitch (born 1980), contemporary French pianist
Madeleine Malraux (1914–2014), concert pianist
Marquesa del Ter (1864–1936), pianist, feminist and linguist
Ginette Martenot (1902–1996), pianist and ondes Martenot player
Berthe Marx (1859–1925), concert pianist remembered for memorizing some 250 works
Marcelle Meyer (1897–1958), pianist performing with Les Six
Nathalia Milstein (born 1995), award-winning classical pianist
Caroline Montigny-Rémaury (1843–1913), virtuoso pianist
Germaine Mounier (1920–2006), classical pianist and music educator
Isabelle Oehmichen (born 1961), pianist and educator
Micheline Ostermeyer (1922–2001), athlete and concert pianist
Cécile Ousset (born 1936), global concert performer and educator
Simone Plé-Caussade (1987–1986), music educator, composer and pianist
Henriette Puig-Roget (1910–1992), pianist, organist and music educator
Anne Queffélec (born 1948), concert pianist and chamber musician
Anne Rey (1944–2012), musicologist, pianist, journalist and educator
Éliane Richepin (1910–1999), pianist and educator
Jacqueline Robin (1917–2007), pianist and accompanist
Marie-Aimée Roger-Miclos (1860–1951), widely performed concert pianist and educator
Véronique Roux (born 1955), pianist and chamber musician
Caroline Sageman (born 1973), pianist specializing in Chopin and Liszt and educator
Lise de la Salle (born 1988), classical pianist
Amandine Savary (born 1984), concert pianist, chamber musician and educator
Blanche Selva (1884–1942), pianist, educator, writer and composer
Lydie Solomon (born 1982), pianist and actress
Elizabeth Sombart (born 1958), pianist and educator
Valérie Soudères (1914–1995), pianist, composer and educator
Emmanuelle Swiercz (born 1978), classical pianist
Nadia Tagrine (1917–2003), pianist and music broadcaster
Sophie Teboul (born 1976), pianist and educator
Françoise Thinat (born 1934), pianist and educator
Hélène Tysman (born 1982), classical pianist
Germaine Thyssens-Valentin (1902–1987), classical pianist specializing in French music
Andrée Vaurabourg (1894–1980), pianist and educator
Justine Verdier (born 1985), classical pianist
Marie Vermeulin (born 1983), pianist and chamber musician
Vanessa Wagner (born 1973), classical pianist

Georgia
Eteri Andjaparidze (born 1956), pianist and educator now based in USA
Elisso Bolkvadze (born 1967), award-winning classical pianist
Khatia Buniatishvili (born 1987), French-Georgian concert pianist
Manana Doijashvili (fl. 1970s), pianist and educator
Marina Goglidze-Mdivani (born 1936), Georgian concert pianist now based in Canada
Inga Kashakashvili (fl. 1991), classical concert pianist
Aliza Kezeradze (1937–1996), pianist and educator
Elisabeth Leonskaja (born 1945), Soviet-Georgian pianist now based in Vienna
Marina Nadiradze (born 1978), concert pianist now based in Scotland
Irma Svanadze (fl. 2000s), classical pianist now based in the United States
Tamriko Siprashvili (born 1963), pianist and educator
Anastasia Virsaladze (1883–1968), concert pianist and educator
Eliso Virsaladze (born 1942), Georgian concert pianist and educator

Germany
Valentina Babor (born 1989), classical concert pianist from an early age
Maria Baptist (born 1971), pianist, composer and educator
Elisabeth Brauß (born 1995), concert pianist
Siglind Bruhn (born 1951), musicologist and concert pianist
Rose Cannabich (1764–1839), pianist taught by Mozart
Milana Chernyavska (born 1974), Ukraine-born German classical pianist and chamber musician with a focus on contemporary music
Kimiko Douglass-Ishizaka (born 1976), German-Japanese composer, pianist and former olympic weightlifter
Sandra Droucker (1875–1944), Russian-born concert pianist who settled and taught in Germany before moving to Oslo
Konstanze Eickhorst (born 1961), pianist, chamber musician and educator
Clara Mathilda Faisst (1872–1948), pianist, composer and writer
Caroline Fischer (fl. 2000s), German-Korean concert pianist and educator
Henriette Gaertner (born 1975), classical concert pianist
Umi Garrett (born 2003), classical pianist who started when very young
Gertraud Geißler (fl. 1970s), pianist and educator
Carmen Geutjes (born 2003), concert pianist performing from an early age
Anna Gourari (fl. 1979), Russian-German pianist and recording artist
Erika Haase (1935–2013), classical pianist and educator
Barbara Heller (born 1936), composer and pianist
Else Herold (1906–1909), pianist, recording artist and educator
Elisabeth von Herzogenberg (1847–1892), pianist, composer, singer and philanthropist
Margarita Höhenrieder (born 1956), classical pianist and chamber musician
Therese Jansen Bartolozzi (1770–1843), German-born pianist who settled in London
Louise Japha (1826–1910), pianist and composer
Ewa Kupiec (born 1964), Polish-born German pianist and educator
Elena Kuschnerova (born 1959), Russian-German classical concert pianist and educator
Sophie Lebrun (1781–1863), pianist, recording artist and composer
Adele Lewing (1866–1943), pianist and composer
Helene Liebmann (1795–1869), pianist and composer
Sabine Liebner (fl. 2000s), contemporary classical pianist
Draga Matković (1907–2013), Croatian-German pianist, conductor and composer who performed when over 100
Fanny Mendelssohn (1805–1847), composer and pianist
Sophie Menter (1846–1918), pianist and composer, student of Liszt
Kristin Merscher (born 1961), classical pianist and educator
Florence Millet (born 1964), French-German classical pianist and educator
Elly Ney (1882–1968), virtuoso pianist, chamber musician specializing in Beethoven
Adele aus der Ohe (1861–1937), concert pianist and composer
Caroline Oltmanns (born 1962), concert pianist and educator
Mona Asuka Ott (born 1991), concert pianist who performed from an early age
Agnes Elisabeth Overbeck (1870–1919), composer and pianist
Anna Caroline Oury (1808–1880), pianist and composer who settled in England
Sophie Pacini (born 1991), German-Italian pianist who performed from an early age
Edith Picht-Axenfeld (1914–2001), concert pianist and harpsichordist
Aleksandra Romanić (born 1958), Yugoslavian-German concert pianist
Alexandra Röseler (fl. 1988), pianist and mezzo-soprano
Olga Scheps (born 1986), Russian-German concert pianist and chamber musician
Ragna Schirmer (born 1972), classical pianist
Annerose Schmidt (born 1936), concert pianist and educator
Clara Schumann (1819–1896), distinguished pianist, composer and educator
Katharina Sellheim (born 1976), pianist, chamber musician and lied accompanist
Clara Isabella Siegle (born 2000), pianist who performed from an early age
Katharina Treutler (fl. 2000s), concert pianist and educator
Käte van Tricht (1909–1996), organist, pianist, harpsichordist and educator
Dina Ugorskaja (1973–2019), Russian-born German pianist and educator
Therese von Zandt (1771–1858), pianist and singer
Agnes Zimmermann (1847–1925), German concert pianist and composer who lived in England

Greece
Gina Bachauer (1913–1976), classical pianist, educator, and early recording artist
Rita Bouboulidi (20th century), concert pianist and recording artist
Danae Kara (born 1953), classical concert pianist, recording artist and educator
Rena Kyriakou (1917–1994), pianist and composer
Nefeli Mousoura (fl. 2000s), classical pianist
Clio-Danae Othoneou (born 1979), actress, musician and pianist

Haiti
Carmen Brouard (1909–2005), pianist, composer and music educator

Hong Kong
Rachel Cheung (born 1991), award-winning classical pianist
Colleen Lee (born 1980), international concert pianist
Blanc Wan (fl. 2010s), classical pianist and music writer
Eleanor Wong (fl. 1990s), pianist, educator and contest juror

Hungary
Sari Biro (1912–1990), concert pianist and educator who settled in the United States
Ilona Eibenschütz (1873–1967), pianist, a close friend of Brahms
Edith Farnadi (1921–1973), pianist, partner of violinist Jenő Hubay
Annie Fischer (1914–1995), classical pianist and recording artist
Etelka Freund (1879–1977), international concert pianist
Gisella Grosz (1875–1942), classical pianist and educator
Márta Gulyás (born 1953), pianist, chamber musician and educator
Ilona Kabos (1893–1973), Hungarian-British pianist and educator
Lili Kraus (1903–1986), Hungarian-born pianist who settled in New Zealand
Adrienne Krausz (born 1967), classical pianist
Márta Kurtág (1927–2019), classical pianist and educator
Clara Lichtenstein (1860–1946), pianist and educator
Lívia Rév (1916–2018), classical concert pianist
Irén Marik (1905–1986), Hungarian-born pianist who settled in the United States
Zsuzsanna Sirokay (born 1941), classical pianist now based in Switzerland
Valéria Szervánszky (born 1947), Hungarian classical pianist now based in the United Kingdom
Zdenka Ticharich (1900–1979), pianist, music educator and composer
Judit Varga (born 1979), composer, pianist and educator
Stephanie Wurmbrand-Stuppach (1849–1919), pianist and composer

Indonesia
Ayke Agus (born 1949), international classical violinist, pianist and educator
Victoria Audrey Sarasvathi (born 1997), concert pianist
Kuei Pin Yeo (fl. 1980s), classical pianist and educator

Ireland
Rhoda Coghill (1903–2000), pianist, composer and poet
Joan Trimble (1915–2000), composer and pianist
Bettina Walker (1837–1893), pianist and composer, remembered for her memoirs

Israel
Astrith Baltsan (born 1956), concert pianist and musicologist specializing in Beethoven
Berenika Glixman (born 1984), classical pianist'
Dorel Golan (fl. 2000s), classical pianist
Aviya Kopelman (born 1978), composer and pianist
Sally Pinkas (fl. 1983), Israeli-born American pianist specializing in contemporary music
Pnina Salzman (born 1922), classical pianist and educator
Shira Shaked (born 1981), concert pianist now based in New York
Verdina Shlonsky (born 1905), early Israeli composer and pianist
Bella Shteinbuk (born 1960), pianist and educator
Ilana Vered (born 1943), concert pianist and educator
Miri Yampolsky (born 1971), Russian-Israeli pianist

Italy
Lucia Contini Anselmi (1876–1913), pianist and composer
Vanessa Benelli Mosell (born 1987), pianist and conductor performing from an early age
Gilda Buttà (born 1959), concert pianist
Gloria Campaner (born 1986), concert pianist
Graziella Concas (born 1970), pianist and composer
Maria Curcio (c.1919–2009), classical pianist and educator
Ada Gentile (born 1947), pianist and composer
Virginia Mariani Campolieti (1869–1941), pianist, orchestra conductor and composer
Maria Perrotta (born 1974), classical concert pianist
Teresa Rampazzi (1914–2001), pianist with an interest in avant-garde music
Beatrice Rana (born 1993), pianist and recording artist
Madame Ravissa (died 1807), singer and composer
Gilda Ruta (1853–1932), pianist, music educator and composer
Antonia Sarcina (born 1963), pianist, composer and conductor
Marina Scalafiotti (born 1965), concert pianist and educator
Maria Tipo (born 1931), concert pianist, recording artist and educator
Mariangela Vacatello (born 1982), international concert pianist
Veronica Rudian (born 1990), international concert pianist, composer
Chiara Bertoglio (born 1983), concert pianist, musicologist, writer and theologian

Japan
Akiko Ebi (born 1953), Japanese-French international concert pianist
Sachiko Furuhata-Kersting (born 1965), concert pianist
Etsuko Hirose (born 1979), classical concert pianist
Satoko Inoue (born 1958), concert pianist
Kei Itoh (fl. 1977), concert pianist
Mayumi Kameda (born 1957), concert pianist
Yoko Kanno (born 1963), composer, arranger, participating in anime films and soundtracks
Yuko Kawai (fl. 1990s), concert pianist specializing in Chopin
Mine Kawakami (born 1969), pianist and composer
Ruriko Kikuchi (fl. 1970s), pianist and educator
Aimi Kobayashi (born 1995), classical pianist
Nobu Kōda (1870–1946), composer, violinist, pianist and educator
Mari Kodama (born 1967), classical concert pianist and recording artist
Momo Kodama (born 1972), classical concert pianist specializing in French and Japanese modern compositions
Yu Kosuge (born 1983), concert pianist who played from an early age
Mayako Kubo (born 1947), pianist and composer now in Berlin
Mari Kumamoto (born 1964), pianist and educator known for her recordings of Spanish and Japanese composers
Nagino Maruyama (born 1999), classical pianist
Yuki Matsuzawa (born 1960), pianist specializing in Chopin
Yoko Misumi (fl. 2000s), concert pianist and chamber musician
Haruna Miyake (born 1942), pianist and composer
Miku Nishimoto-Neubert (fl. 1990s), pianist and educator
Noriko Ogawa (born 1962), Japanese pianist based in London
Saori Sarina Ohno (born 1970), pianist and chamber musician
Alice Sara Ott (born 1988), German-born Japanese classical pianist
Hiroko Sasaki (fl. 2000s), pianist, chamber musician and educator
Atsuko Seki (born 1964), classical pianist
Atsuko Seta (born 1955), concert pianist and educator
Fumiko Shiraga (1967–2017), German-Japanese classical pianist
Yukiko Sugawara (fl. 1990s), pianist and chamber musician
Aki Takahashi (born 1944), pianist specializing in contemporary classical music
Marika Takeuchi (born 1987), contemporary composer, music producer and pianist
Mitsuko Uchida (born 1948), Japanese-British pianist and conductor specializing in Mozart and Schubert
Ayako Uehara (born 1980), classical pianist
Yumiko Urabe (born 1959), classical pianist and educator

Kazakhstan
Jania Aubakirova (born 1957), classical pianist

Latvia
Lūcija Garūta (1902–1977), pianist, poet and composer
Olga Jegunova (born 1984), classical pianist now based in London
Shoshana Rudiakov (1948–2012), pianist and music educator

Lithuania
Sulamita Aronovsky (born 1929), classical pianist and educator now based in London
Adelė Daunoravičiūtė (born 1991), award-winning classical pianist
Nadezhda Dukstulskaite (1912–1978), pianist who promoted interest in Lithuanian composers
Evelina Puzaitė (born 1982), pianist, composer and writer
Mūza Rubackytė (born 1959), pianist and educator now based in Paris
Raminta Šerkšnytė (born 1975), composer and pianist
Aleksandra Žvirblytė (born 1971), pianist and educator

Luxembourg
Cathy Krier (born 1985), international concert pianist
Albena Petrovic-Vratchanska (born 1965), Bulgarian-born composer, pianist and educator who has settled in Luxembourg

Mexico
Graciela Agudelo (1945–2018), pianist and composer
Sofía Cancino de Cuevas (1897–1982), composer, pianist, singer and conductor
Alba Herrera y Ogazón (1885–1931), pianist, writer, educator and musicologist
Maria Teresa Naranjo Ochoa (1934–2007), virtuoso pianist and educator
Margot Rojas Mendoza (1903–1996), concert pianist and educator
Alicia Urreta (1930–1986), pianist, music educator and composer
Consuelo Villalon Aleman (1907–1998), pianist and educator specializing in Chopin
Betty Zanolli Fabila (born 1965), pianist and music educator
Eva Maria Zuk (1945–2017), Polish-Mexican concert pianist

Netherlands
Dina Appeldoorn (1884–1938), composer, pianist and accompanist
Helena Basilova (born 1983), Russian-born classical pianist and educator based in the Netherlands
Gertrude van den Bergh (1793–1840), pianist and composer
Sarah Bosmans-Benedicts (1861–1949), pianist and educator
Elizabeth Joanetta Catherine von Hagen (1750–1809), pianist, educator and composer living in the United States
Kristina Sandulova (born 1978), Bulgarian-Dutch classical pianist
Arielle Vernède (born 1953), classical pianist
Rosy Wertheim (1888–1949), pianist, music educator and composer

New Zealand
Dorothy Davies (1899–1987), pianist and piano teacher
Joan Havill (fl. 2000s), pianist and educator based in London
Jennie Macandrew (1866–1949), pianist, organist, music educator and conductor
Janetta McStay (1917–2012), pianist, chamber musician and educator
Vera Moore (1896–1997), concert pianist who enjoyed a successful career both in England and New Zealand
Doris Gertrude Sheppard (1902–1982), British-born New Zealand pianist, singer, composer and educator

Norway
Amalie Christie (1913–2010), classical pianist and music writer
Agathe Backer Grøndahl (1847–1907), pianist and composer
Theodora Cormontan (1840–1922), pianist, music publisher and composer who made a name in Norway before emigrating to the United States
Mary Barratt Due (1888–1969), influential Norwegian pianist and educator
Maja Flagstad (1871–1958), pianist, choral conductor and accompanist
Kari Marie Aarvold Glaser (1901–1972), pianist and educator
Liv Glaser (born 1935), pianist and educator
Eva Knardahl (1927–2006), child prodigy and concert pianist who emigrated to the United States
Ruth Lagesen (1914–2005), pianist and conductor
Erika Nissen (1845–1903), concert pianist and music educator
Ingfrid Breie Nyhus (born 1978), classical pianist
Anne-Marie Ørbeck (1911–1996), pianist and composer
Anne Eline Riisnæs (born 1951), pianist and educator
Eline Nygaard Riisnæs (1913–2011), pianist and musicologist
Natalia Strelchenko (1976–2015), world-renowned concert pianist of Russian origin
Gunilla Süssmann (born 1977), classical pianist
Hanna-Marie Weydahl (1922–2016), concert pianist and educator

Peru
Myriam Avalos (fl. 2000s), classical pianist from an early age

Philippines
Cecile Licad (fl. 1980s), concert pianist and recording artist
Rowena Sánchez Arrieta (born 1962), concert pianist
Ingrid Sala Santamaria (born 1940), concert pianist

Poland
Nelly Ben-Or (born 1933), pianist and educator now based in England
Felicja Blumental (1908–1991), pianist and recording artist specializing in Beethoven and Chopin
Marcelina Czartoryska (1817–1894), pianist, student of Chopin
Joanna Domańska (born 1959), pianist and music educator
Halina Czerny-Stefańska (1922–2001), pianist and contest juror
Władysława Markiewiczówna (1900–1982), pianist and renowned educator
Róża Etkin-Moszkowska (1908–1945), pianist specializing in Chopin
Lidia Grychtołówna (born 1928), international concert pianist
Barbara Hesse-Bukowska (1930–2013), concert pianist
Katarzyna Jaczynowska (1872–1920), pianist and educator
Maryla Jonas (1911–1959), Polish pianist who moved to Brazil and later to the United States
Natalia Karp (1911–2007), concert pianist and Holocaust survivor
Gabriela Moyseowicz (born 1944), composer and pianist
Katarzyna Popowa-Zydroń (born 1948), pianist, educator and contest juror of Bulgarian descent
Monika Rosca (born 1961), former child actress, now a pianist
Regina Smendzianka (1924–2011), pianist who performed from the age of eight
Marta Sosińska (born 1939), classical pianist and educator now based in Germany
Jadwiga Szajna-Lewandowska (1912–1994), pianist, music educator and composer
Paula Szalit (c.1887–1920), pianist and composer
Beata Szalwinska (fl. 1990s), concert pianist based in Luxembourg
Jadwiga Szamotulska (1911–1981), pianist, music and voice educator and recording artist
Antoinette Szumowska (1868–1938), concert pianist and music educator
Maria Szymanowska (1789–1831), composer and early virtuoso pianist
Izabella Zielińska (1910–2017), concert pianist and educator

Portugal
Maria João Pires (born 1944), pianist and educator
Helena Sá e Costa (1913–2006), concert pianist and educator

Romania
Elena Asachi (1789–1877), pianist, singer and composer
Esmeralda Athanasiu-Gardeev (1834–1917), pianist and composer
Alina Bercu (born 1990), classical concert pianist
Elena Bibescu (1855–1902), noblewoman considered to be one of the greatest 19th-century pianists
Manya Botez (1896–1971), pianist and children's music teacher
Dana Ciocarlie (born 1968), pianist and educator now based in France
Alexandra Dariescu (born 1985), concert pianist from an early age
Cella Delavrancea (1887–1991), pianist, writer and piano teacher
Violeta Dinescu (born 1953), composer, pianist and educator based in Germany
Carola Grindea (1914–2009), Romanian-born British pianist and educator
Clara Haskil (1895–1960), classical pianist
Diana Ionescu (born 1981), international concert pianist
Myriam Marbe (1931–1997), composer and pianist
Florica Musicescu (1887–1969), renowned pianist and music educator
Liana Șerbescu (born 1934), pianist, educator and musicologist
Silvia Șerbescu (1903–1965), concert pianist and educator
Alexandra Silocea (born 1984), concert pianist based in Vienna
Mihaela Ursuleasa (1978–2012), concert pianist and recording artist

Russia
Ella Adayevskaya (1846–1926), composer, pianist and ethnomusicologist
Nelly Akopian-Tamarina (born 1941), classical concert pianist who performed from an early age
Natalya Antonova (born 1974), classical pianist and educator
Yulianna Avdeeva (born 1985), concert pianist
Helena Basilova (born 1983), classical pianist based in the Netherlands
Elena Beckman-Shcherbina (1882–1951), pianist, composer and educator
Maria Belooussova (died 2018), chamber music specialist based in Paris
Ludmila Berlinskaya (born 1960), pianist and actress
Violetta Egorova (born 1969), international concert pianist
Violetta Egorova (born 1936), pianist and educator
Irina Emeliantseva (born 1973), composer, chamber musician and pianist
Victoria Foust (born 1975), classical pianist and composer
Margarita Fyodorova (1927–2016), Soviet Russian pianist
Eugenia Gabrieluk (born 1967), international concert pianist
Varvara Gaigerova (1903–1944), composer and pianist
Elena Gilels (1948–1996), pianist remembered for Mozart's piano concertos
Vera Gornostayeva (1929–2015), pianist and educator
Maria Grinberg (1908–1978), Soviet pianist and educator
Anastasia Gromoglasova (born 1984), classical pianist and duo piano performer
Sofya Gulyak (born 1979), classical pianist
Tamara Guseva (born 1926), Soviet Russian classical pianist
Zinaida Ignatyeva (born 1938), pianist and educator
Valentina Igoshina (born 1978), award-winning classical pianist
Leokadiya Kashperova (1872–1940), pianist, Romantic composer and educator
Elizaveta Klyuchereva (born 1999), award-winning pianist who has performed from an early age
Olga Kozlova (born 1986), classical pianist
Polina Leschenko (fl. 2000s), concert pianist who performed from an early age
Tatiana Nikolayeva (1924–1993), Soviet-Russian pianist, composer and educator
Dina Parakhina (fl. 1980s), Russian-born concert pianist and educator now based in the United Kingdom
Olga Pashchenko (born 1986), international harpsichordist, fortepianist, organist and pianist
Irina Plotnikova (born 1954), concert pianist and educator
Viktoria Postnikova (born 1944), international concert pianist and chamber musician
Nadezhda Rimskaya-Korsakova (1848–1919), pianist and composer who influenced her husband Rimsky-Korsakov
Elena Rostropovich (born 1958), concert pianist and philanthropist working for the well-being of children
Kira Shashkina (20th century), pianist and renowned educator
Tatiana Shebanova (1953–2011), international concert pianist and recording artist who settled in Poland
Katia Skanavi (born 1971), Russian concert pianist of Greek descent
Svetlana Smolina (fl. 2000s), Russian-born pianist active in the United States
Natalia Sokolovskaya (born 1989), international concert pianist and composer
Anna t'Haron (born 1978), pianist and chamber musician
Rosa Tamarkina (1920–1950), Kiev-born Soviet concert pianist, educator and recording artist
Vera Timanova (1855–1942), child prodigy, concert pianist and educator
Anna Tsybuleva (born 1990), classical pianist
Anna Vinnitskaya (born 1983), classical concert pianist
Evelina Vorontsova (born 1972), concert pianist and educator
Marina Yakhlakova (born 1991), pianist who has performed from an early age and continues to receive acclaim
Anna Yesipova (1851–1914), prominent pianist admired in the United States
Maria Yudina (1899–1970), Soviet virtuoso pianist
Lilya Zilberstein (born 1965), pianist and recording artist

Serbia
Slavka Atanasijević (1850–1897), pianist and composer
Lidija Bizjak (born 1976), concert pianist
Sanja Bizjak (born 1988), concert pianist
Zorica Dimitrijević-Stošić (1934–2013), pianist, accompanist and educator
Olivera Đurđević (1928–2006), pianist, harpsichordist and educator
Marija Gluvakov (born 1973), pianist and educator
Rita Kinka (born 1962), classical pianist of Hungarian descent
Olga Mihajlović (fl. 1939–1978), classical pianist and educator
Jasna Popovic (fl. 1997), classical concert pianist
Aleksandra Trajković (born 1975), classical pianist and educator, widely broadcast on Yugoslav TV and radio
Nataša Veljković (born 1968), classical pianist now based in Vienna
Vera Veljkov-Medaković (1923–2011), concert pianist and educator
Ljiljana Vukajlović (fl. 1966), pianist, accompanist and chamber musician

Singapore
Abigail Sin (born 1992), award-winning classical pianist
Margaret Leng Tan (born 1945), classical musician known for her work as a professional toy pianist

Slovakia
Sylvia Čápová-Vizváry (born 1947), concert pianist
Viera Janárceková (born 1941), pianist, composer and educator now based in Germany
Monika Mockovčáková (born 1971), classical concert pianist

Slovenia
Nina Prešiček (born 1976), concert pianist

South Africa
Elsie Hall (1877–1976), prominent Australian-born South African classical pianist

South Korea
Yoonjung Han (born 1985), Korean-American pianist and educator
Heejae Kim (born c.1987), classical pianist
Jiyeong Mun (born 1995), pianist and chamber musician
Yeol Eum Son (born 1986), concert pianist and educator
Haewon Song (fl. 1980s), concert pianist now based in the United States
Hai-Kyung Suh (born 1960), South Korean pianist based in New York
Joyce Yang (born 1986), concert pianist now based in the United States
Jeanne You (born 1978), concert pianist and educator now based in Germany

Spain
Rosa García Ascot (1902–2002), composer and pianist specializing in de Falla
Amparo Iturbi (1898–1969), pianist who played in MGM musicals
Alicia de Larrocha (1923–2009), legendary pianist and composer
Teresa Llacuna (born 1935), Catalan classical pianist
Leonora Milà Romeu (born 1942), Catalan pianist and composer
Paloma O'Shea (born 1936), pianist and arts patron
Marianna Prjevalskaya (born 1982), Russian-born Spanish pianist who performs internationally

Sri Lanka
Shani Diluka (born 1976), Monaco-born Sri Lankan pianist
Tanya Ekanayaka (born 1977), concert pianist and composer

Sweden
Valborg Aulin (1860–1928), pianist and composer
Ebba d'Aubert (1819–1860), concert pianist
Monica Dominique (born 1940), pianist, composer and actress
Marianne Ehrenström (1773–1867), writer, singer, painter and pianist
Aurore von Haxthausen (1830–1888), writer, composer and pianist
Ingrid Fuzjko Hemming (born 1932), classical concert pianist
Wilhelmina Josephson (1816–1906), notable pianist and educator
Maria Lettberg (born 1970), pianist now living in Berlin
Sara Augusta Malmborg (1810–1860), singer, pianist and painter
Natalya Pasichnyk (born 1971), Swedish-Ukrainian classical pianist
Ika Peyron (1845–1922), composer, pianist and organist
Amanda Sandborg Waesterberg (1842–1918), composer, cantor and pianist
Ingeborg Bronsart von Schellendorf (1840–1913), Swedish-German composer and concert pianist
Julia Sigova (born 1982), concert pianist
Fanny Stål (1821–1889), classical concert pianist
Bertha Tammelin (1836–1915), actress, mezzo-soprano, pianist, composer and drama teacher
Emilia Uggla (1819–1855), classical concert pianist and concert singer

Switzerland
Caroline Boissier-Butini (1786–1836), pianist and composer
Hélène Boschi (1917–1990), Franco-Swiss pianist and educator
Sylviane Deferne (born 1965), concert pianist
Lisy Fischer (1900–1999), concert pianist and educator
Fanny Hünerwadel (1826–1854), pianist, singer and composer
Margaret Kitchin (1914–2008), classical pianist associated with contemporary music
Marguerite Roesgen-Champion (1895–1976), composer, pianist and harpsichordist
Marianne Schroeder (born 1949), pianist and composer

Taiwan
Fenia Chang (fl. 2000s), concert pianist and educator
Christiana Lin (fl. 1990s), Chinese-Austrian pianist and harpsichordist
Chen Pi-hsien (born 1950), Taiwanese-German classical pianist and educator
Ching-yun Hu (fl. 2000s), award-winning classical pianist
Chia-Hui Lu (born 1976), classical concert pianist
Szuyu Rachel Su (born 1998), award-winning concert pianist

Turkey
Anjelika Akbar (born 1969), composer, pianist and writer
İdil Biret (born 1941), known for her romantic repertoire
Verda Erman (1944–2014), concert pianist
Lara Melda (born 1993), British-Turkish concert pianist
Ayşegül Sarıca (born 1935), concert pianist and educator
Zeynep Üçbaşaran (fl. 2000s), award-winning pianist

Ukraine
Anna Fedorova (born 1990), concert pianist
Génia (fl. 1999), London-based Ukrainian-born virtuoso pianist and composer
Anna Kravtchenko (born 1976), pianist and educator now based in Switzerland
Valentina Lisitsa (born 1973), Ukrainian-born American pianist
Irina Zaritskaya (1939–2001), pianist who later settled in London

United Kingdom
Imogen Cooper (born 1949), concert pianist and chamber musician
Jill Crossland (fl. 2000s), English classical pianist
Fanny Davies (1861–1934), Guernsey-born British classical pianist
Adelina de Lara (1872–1925), classical pianist and composer
Alice Diehl (1844–1912), concert pianist who became a novelist
Sophia Dussek (1775–1831), Scottish singer, pianist, harpist and composer
Margaret Fairchild (1911–1989), concert pianist, nun and homeless woman
Margaret Fingerhut (born 1955), classical pianist and educator
Alissa Firsova (born 1986), Russian-born British classical composer, pianist and conductor
Norma Fisher (born 1940), concert pianist and educator
Kyla Greenbaum (1922-2017), British pianist who specialised in contemporary music
Margaret Kitchin (1914–2008), Swiss-born British pianist who specialised in contemporary music 
Harriet Hague (1793–1816), pianist and composer
Myra Hess (1890–1965), classical pianist who maintained morale by playing during World War II
Dorothy Howell (1898–1982), composer and pianist
Edna Iles (1905–2003), English classical pianist who broadcast frequently
Elizabeth Jonas (c.1825–1877), child prodigy, concert pianist and educator
Anna Robena Laidlaw (1819–1901), court pianist to the Queen of Hanover
Kate Loder (1825–1904), composer and pianist
Iris Loveridge (1917–2000), English classical pianist specializing in British contemporary music
Moura Lympany (1916–2005), concert pianist
Joanna MacGregor (born 1959), concert pianist, conductor, composer and festival curator
Elizabeth Norman McKay (1931–2018), musicologist, pianist and lieder accompanist
Yaltah Menuhin (1921–2001), American-born British pianist, artist and poet
Gayatri Nair (born 2001), Indian-British pianist and singer
Anne Naysmith (1937–2015), classical pianist known for sleeping rough
Marie Novello (1884–1928), Welsh professional pianist
Maria Frances Parke (1772–1822), soprano, pianist and composer
Annette Bryn Parri (fl. 2000s), Welsh classical pianist and accompanist
Jane Savage (c.1753–1824), harpsichordist and composer
Irene Scharrer (1888–1971), English classical pianist and recording artist
Phyllis Sellick (1911–2007), pianist and educator who performed with her husband Cyril Smith
Millicent Silver (1905–1986), harpsichordist, pianist and violinist
Kathryn Stott (born 1958), classical concert pianist and chamber musician
Penelope Thwaites (fl. 1970s), British-Australian concert pianist and recording artist, specializing in the music of Percy Grainger
Denise Tolkowsky (1918–1991), pianist and composer who settled in Belgium
Valerie Tryon (born 1934), classical pianist who spends much of her time in Canada
Mitsuko Uchida (born 1948), Japanese-born British classical pianist and conductor
Adela Verne (1877–1952), prominent classical pianist of her era
Mathilde Verne (1865–1936), concert pianist and educator
Mary Wurm (1860–1938), pianist and composer who settled in Germany
Di Xiao (fl. 1996), Chinese-British classical pianist

United States
Armenta Adams (born 1936), African-American concert pianist and educator
Esther Allan (1914–1985), composer, pianist and organist
Stell Andersen (1897–1989), international concert pianist
Katja Andy (1907–2013), German-American pianist and educator
Lydia Artymiw (fl. 1970s), concert pianist and educator
Lola Astanova (born 1982), Uzbek-American pianist specializing in Chopin, Liszt and Rachmaninoff
Lera Auerbach (born 1973), Russian-born American classical composer and pianist
Dorothea Austin (1921–2011), Austrian-American pianist, composer and educator
Nadia Azzi (born 1998), pianist of Lebanese-Japanese origin who has performed from an early age
Blanche Hermine Barbot (1842–1919), Belgian-born pianist, educator and music director who settled in the United States
Jennifer Margaret Barker (born 1965), Scottish-American composer and pianist
Margaret Baxtresser (1922–2005), international concert pianist
Amy Beach (1867–1944), composer and pianist
Emily Bear (born 2001), composer, pianist and singer who has performed from an early age
Sonya Belousova (born 1990), Russian-born American composer, pianist and recording artist
Joan Benson (1925–2020), clavichordist, fortepianist and pianist
Sondra Bianca (born 1930), concert pianist, educator and recording artist
Fannie Bloomfield Zeisler (1863–1927), Austrian-American concert pianist
Birdie Blye (1871–1935), child prodigy who toured widely, later concert pianist
Mary Louise Boehm (1924–2002), pianist and painter
Margaret Bonds (1913–1972), early African American composer and pianist
Elena Braslavsky (fl. 1980s), Russian-American international concert pianist and chamber musician
Allison Brewster Franzetti (fl. 1974), pianist, music educator and recording artist
Antonia Brico (1902–1989), Dutch-American conductor and pianist
Judith Burganger (born 1939), pianist and educator
Winifred Byrd (1884–1970), concert pianist and educator
Sarah Cahill (born 1960), pianist, music writer and radio host
Angelin Chang (fl. 1990s), award-winning pianist and educator
Abbey Perkins Cheney (born 1851), pianist and educator
Gloria Cheng (fl. 2000s), contemporary music pianist and film director
Kate Sara Chittenden (1856–1949), piano teacher and music school founder
Naida Cole (born 1974), Canadian-American concert pianist
Sylvia Constantinidis (born 1962), Venezuelan-America pianist, composer and conductor
Mildred Couper (1887–1974), prominent composer and pianist experimenting with quarter-tone music
Cindy Cox (born 1961), composer and pianist
Évelyne Crochet (born 1934), French-born American classical pianist
Bella Davidovich (born 1928), Soviet-born American pianist and educator
Sharon Davis (born 1937), composer, pianist and music publisher
Karin Dayas (1892–1971), pianist and music educator
Simone Dinnerstein (born 1972), classical pianist noted for recordings of Bach's Goldberg Variations
Ania Dorfmann (1899–1984), Russian-born American pianist and educator
Marylène Dosse (born 1939), French-born American pianist and educator
Yelena Eckemoff (fl. 1991), Russian-American pianist, composer and educator
Reena Esmail (born 1983), pianist and composer
Florence Kirsch Du Brul (1915–2005), concert pianist and educator
Elisenda Fábregas (born 1955), Spanish-born American pianist and composer
Amy Fay (1844–1928), pianist and writer
Nohema Fernández (born 1944), Cuban-born American pianist and educator
Chloe Flower (born 1985), composer, writer, producer and pianist
Liana Forest (fl. 1990s), Russian-born pianist and recording artist based in the United States
Madeleine Forte (born 1938), French-American pianist, recording artist and educator
Vera Franceschi (1926–1966), Italian-American pianist specializing in Chopin
Gabriela Lena Frank (born 1972), pianist and contemporary music composer
Elinor Freer (fl. 2000s), pianist and educator
Alice Frisca (1900–1960), concert pianist
Umi Garrett (born 2000), American-Japanese classical pianist
Mona Golabek (fl. 1970s), concert pianist, writer and radio host
Edna Golandsky (fl. 1970s), pianist and educator
Martha Goldstein (1919–2014), harpsichordist and pianist
Patricia Goodson (born 1954), American pianist based in the Czech Republic
Thomasina Talley Greene (1913–2003), African-American concert pianist and educator
Bonnie Gritton (fl. 1970s), music educator and concert pianist
Helen Eugenia Hagan (1891–1964), African American pianist, educator and composer
Elizabeth Joanetta Catherine von Hagen (1750–1809), Dutch-born pianist, educator and composer who lived in the United States
Emilie Hammarskjöld (1821–1854), Swedish-born American composer, singer, pianist, educator and organist
Hazel Harrison (1883–1969), African American concert pianist
Babette Hierholzer (born 1957), German-American pianist and artistic director
Natalie Hinderas (1927-1987), African American pianist and educator
Mary Howe (1882–1964), composer and pianist
Helen Huang (born 1982), Chinese-American pianist and educator
Claire Huangci (born 1990), classical pianist of Chinese origin
Adella Prentiss Hughes (1869–1950), pianist, impresario, founder of the Cleveland Orchestra
Jennifer Hymer (fl. 1990s), American pianist based in Hamburg, Germany
Lilian Kallir (1931–2004), Czech-born American pianist
Tara Kamangar (fl. 2005), pianist and composer
Constance Keene (1921–2005), pianist and educator
Anne Gamble Kennedy (1920–2001), African American pianist, accompanist and educator
Nina Gamble Kennedy (born 1960), African American pianist, conductor, filmmaker and writer
Olga Kern (born 1975), Russian-American classical pianist
Minuetta Kessler (1914–2002), Russian-born American concert pianist, composer and educator
Angela Jia Kim (fl. 1990s), classical pianist
Dina Koston (c.1929–2009), pianist, music educator and composer
Min Kwon (fl. 1990s), Korean-American pianist and educator
Ruth Laredo (1937–2005), concert pianist remembered for recordings of Rachmaninoff
Mihae Lee (fl. 1970s), South Korean-born American pianist and chamber musician
Soyeon Kate Lee (born 1979), Korean-American pianist and educator
Xenia Boodberg Lee (1927–2004), concert pianist playing modern works
Tina Lerner (1889–c.1947), Russian-American concert pianist and educator
Ray Lev (1912–1968), concert pianist and recording artist
Beth Levin (born 1950), classical pianist
Rosina Lhévinne (1880–1976), Ukrainian-born American pianist and educator
Gertrude Lightstone Mittelmann (1907–1956), concert pianist and broadcaster
Ang Li (born 1985), classical concert pianist featured in broadcasts and recordings
Jenny Lin (born 1973), Taiwanese-American concert pianist
Valentina Lisitsa (born 1973), Ukrainian-American concert pianist and popular recording artist
Barbara Lister-Sink (born 1947), pianist, educator and leader in injury-preventive keyboard technique
Kate Liu (born 1994), Singaporean-American pianist specializing in Chopin
Katherine Allen Lively, American pianist, writer and songwriter
Oksana Lutsyshyn (born 1964), Ukrainian-American recording artist, pianist and educator
Gulimina Mahamuti (born 1978), Uyghur Chinese-born American concert pianist
Mana-Zucca (1885–1981), actress, singer, pianist and composer
Adele Marcus (1906–1995), pianist and educator
Helen Marlais (fl. 2000s), pianist and music writer
Melissa Marse (born 1974), pianist and chamber musician
Anne-Marie McDermott (born 1963), classical pianist and chamber musician
Louise Meiszner (1924–2008), pianist and music educator
Susan Merdinger (born 1962), classical pianist, music director and educator
Yolanda Mero (1887–1963), Hungarian-American pianist, opera and theatre impresario and philanthropist
Beata Moon (born 1969), Korean-American pianist and composer
Marilyn Neeley (1937–2007), award-winning pianist
Soon Hee Newbold (fl. 2000s), composer, conductor, musician and actress
Ethel Newcomb (1875–1959), pianist who opened a music studio in New York
Quynh Nguyen (fl. 1987), Vietnamese-American classical pianist
Erika Nickrenz (born 1963), classical pianist and chamber musician
Grace Nikae (fl. 1990s), Japanese-American concert pianist and chamber musician
Barbara Nissman (born 1944), pianist specializing in Alberto Ginastera and Sergei Prokofiev
Heather O'Donnell (born 1973), classical pianist
Ursula Oppens (born 1944), concert pianist and educator
Margaret Saunders Ott (1920–2010), pianist and educator
Our Lady J (fl. 2000s), pianist, television writer and producer
Terry Winter Owens (1941–2007), composer, violinist, pianist, chamber musician and educator
Natasha Paremski (born 1987), Russian-American classical pianist
Margaret Patrick (1913–1994), African American member of the Ebony and Ivory duo
Beverley Peck Johnson (1904–2001), voice teacher, soprano and pianist
Rebecca Penneys (born 1946), pianist, chamber musician and educator
Navah Perlman (fl. 1986), pianist and chamber musician
Sally Pinkas (fl. 1983), Israeli-American pianist and educator
Wynne Pyle (1881–1971), concert pianist
Eda Rapoport (1890–1968), Lativian-American composer and pianist
Liza Redfield (1924–2018), conductor, pianist and composer
Caroline Keating Reed (d. 1954), American pianist and music teacher
Nadia Reisenberg (1904–1983), Lithuanian-American pianist and educator
Blanche Robinson (1863–1969), composer and piano accompanist
Martha Baird Rockefeller (1895–1971), pianist, philanthropist and arts advocate
Kathryn Salfelder (born 1987), composer, conductor and pianist
Olga Samaroff (1880–1948), pianist, music critic and educator
Lucy Scarbrough (1927–2020), pianist, conductor and educator
Madeline Schiller (1843–1911), British-born American pianist and educator
Helen Schnabel (1911–1974), pianist and recording artist
Philippa Schuyler (1931–1967), African American child prodigy, concert pianist and journalist
Marthe Servine (died 1972), French-American pianist and composer
Orli Shaham (born 1975), concert pianist, chamber musician and radio presenter
Regina Shamvili (fl. 2000s), Georgian-American pianist performing internationally
Marilyn Shrude (born 1946), contemporary classical pianist and educator
Bella Shumiatcher (1911–1990), Russian-American pianist and music educator
Faye-Ellen Silverman (born 1947), composer, pianist and educator
Lori Sims (fl. 1990s), classical pianist and educator
Ruth Slenczynska (born 1925), classical pianist who performed from an early age
Julia Smith (1905–1989), composer, pianist and music writer
Eleanor Sokoloff (1914–2020), pianist and educator
Teresa Sterne (1927–2000), pianist and record producer
Grete Sultan (1906–2005), German-American pianist and educator
Kathleen Supové (fl. 2000s), pianist specializing in modern classical music
Nina Svetlanova (born 1932), Russian-American concert pianist and educator
Gloria Wilson Swisher (born 1935), composer, music educator and pianist
Margaret Leng Tan (born 1945), Singaporean-born American pianist, often using unconventional instruments
Marioara Trifan (born 1950), internationally performing pianist and conductor
Rosalyn Tureck (1913–2003), pianist, harpsichordist and Bach specialist
Aline van Barentzen (1897–1981), Franco-American classical pianist
Isabelle Vengerova (1877–1956), Russian-American pianist and music educator
Amelia von Ende (1856–1932), Polish-American writer, pianist, composer, educator and translator
Lucille Wallace (1898–1977), American-born harpsichordist who settled in English
Elinor Remick Warren (1900–1991), composer of contemporary classical music and pianist
Janice Weber (born 1950), pianist and novelist
Gertrude Weinstock (1904–1985), concert pianist
Wu Han (born 1959), Taiwanese-American pianist, recording artist, educator and cultural entrepreneur
Julianne Vanden Wyngaard (fl. 1960s), carillonist and pianist
Oxana Yablonskaya (born 1938), Russian-American international concert pianist and recording artist
Sophia Yan (born 1986), classical pianist and international journalist
Berenika Zakrzewski (born 1983), international concert pianist who has performed since she was 8
Marion Zarzeczna (fl. 1950s), concert pianist and educator
Lauren Zhang (born 2001), classical pianist, winner of the 2018 BBC Young Musician Contest
Serene, American classical concert pianist and technologist.

Uruguay
Dinorah Varsi (1939–2013), classical pianist

Uzbekistan
Gulnora Alimova (born 1971), classical pianist
Anna Malikova (born 1965), concert pianist, recording artist and educator

Venezuela
Corin Akl Jáuregui (born 1966), composer, pianist, educator
Teresa Carreño (1853–1917), pianist, soprano, composer and conductor
Gabriela Montero (born 1970), classical pianist and improvisation specialist
Alba Quintanilla (born 1944), composer, harpist, harpsichordist, pianist, conductor and educator
Clara Rodríguez (born 1970)

See also

Lists of women in music
Women in classical music

External links

 
Lists of musicians by instrument
Classical
Lists of women in music